Gazu (also Romanized as Gazū; also known as Ḩājjīābād, Gaxu, Gazo, and Gazook) is a village in Poshtkuh Rural District, in the Central District of Khash County, Sistan and Baluchestan Province, Iran. At the 2006 census, its population was 329, in 65 families.

References 

Populated places in Khash County